Sergiyev Posad is a city and the administrative center of Sergiyevo-Posadsky District in Moscow Oblast, Russia. Population: 

It was previously known as Sergiyev Posad (until 1919), Sergiyev (until 1930), Zagorsk (until 1991).

History

The city of Sergiyev Posad is the religious center of the Moscow Region as its first monastery was founded in 1337.
The monastery began as a church built by Sergius of Radonezh, made out of wood, and by 1345 was recognized as a place of religious worship.
 Town status was granted to Sergiyev Posad in 1742. In the 16th and 17th centuries, the religious center continued expanding into new monastery buildings, living areas, and stone walls, which withheld a Polish Siege of 1608-1610.In the 18th century, wooden monasteries were mostly destroyed and began reconstruction and settlement (roads, hotels, stable, and hospice).Lavra was closed in 1919 after the Russian Revolution, like all other places of worship in the USSR.The town's name, alluding to St. Sergius, has strong religious connotations. Soviet authorities changed it first to just Sergiyev in 1919, and then to Zagorsk in 1930, in memory of the revolutionary Vladimir Zagorsky. Sergiyev Posad was penetrated by Germany in 1941. It reopened later in 1941 during WW2 and continued to serve as a religious and historical center of Russia.

The original name was restored in 1991.

Administrative and municipal status
Within the framework of administrative divisions, Sergiyev Posad serves as the administrative center of Sergiyevo-Posadsky District. As an administrative division, it is, together with twenty-six rural localities, incorporated within Sergiyevo-Posadsky District as the City of Sergiyev Posad. As a municipal division, the City of Sergiyev Posad is incorporated within Sergiyevo-Posadsky Municipal District as Sergiyev Posad Urban Settlement.

Culture
The culture of Sergiyev Posad focuses on its religious and toymaking history, as well as classical music and art. The Sergiyev Posad State History and Art Museum-Preserve contain the Lavra complex of monasteries, and a museum called the “Konny Dvor”, which consists of art and excavated artifacts. In addition to the Lavra monasteries, the Chernigovsky Skete was built as a men's monastery in the 19th century, providing space for over 400 monks. Today, the Skete is quiet and peaceful, with only 10 monks coming to complete its everyday functions. 
The Russian wooden toys, Matreshki, were invented there by an artist Sergey Malyutin, and are now displayed in the Toy Museum.There are over 800 exhibits from the 11-21st century, including artifacts from other countries.
Because of the town’s deep-rooted focus on art and music, it has many schools for children, and they are enrolled between the ages of 6-8 years old.

Economy
Tourism associated with the Golden Ring plays a role in the regional economy. There is also an important toy factory.

Transportation
The Moscow–Yaroslavl railway and highway pass through the town. Sergiyev Posad Bus Terminal is located in the city.

Notable people
Andrei Rublev, artist, Church iconography, lived in the 14-15th centuries, author of Saint Trinity's icon.
Daniel Chorniy, artist, Church icononography, lived in the 14-15th centuries.
Pavel Florensky, Russian Orthodox theologian and researcher
Vikentii Trofimov, painter
Vladimir Favorsky, graphic artist, woodcut illustrator, painter
Aristarkh Lentulov, avant-garde artist
Boris Kustodiev, painter
Mikhail Nesterov, painter
German Sterligov, businessman

Twin towns – sister cities

Sergiyev Posad is twinned with:

 Cephalonia, Greece
 Fulda, Germany
 New Athos, Georgia
 Rueil-Malmaison, France
 Saldus, Latvia
 Slonim, Belarus
 Vagharshapat, Armenia

Former twin towns:
 Gniezno, Poland

In March 2022, the Polish city of Gniezno severed its ties with Sergiyev Posad as a response to the 2022 Russian invasion of Ukraine.

References

Notes

Sources

Further reading

External links

Official website of Sergiyev Posad 
Unofficial website of Sergiyev Posad 
Official website of the Sergiyev Posad State History and Art Museum-Reserve 
Official website of the Holy Trinity-St. Sergius Lavra
Sergiyev Posad travelog

Golden Ring of Russia
Cities and towns in Moscow Oblast